Rhynchostegiella is a genus of mosses belonging to the family Brachytheciaceae.

The genus has cosmopolitan distribution.

Species:
 Rhynchostegiella acicula Broth. 
 Rhynchostegiella algiriana

References

Hypnales
Moss genera